Acacia leioderma  also commonly known as the Porongurup wattle is a species of wattle which is endemic to an area in the lower Great Southern region of Western Australia centered on Albany.

It has small, fern-like green phyllodes (leaves) and light golden flowers. Flowers appear between April and November.

The plant's range extends as far west as Walpole, east as Esperance and north as the Porongurup Range. It grows in sand, loam and clay soils and is found along granite outcrops.

Acacia leioderma is one of the main understorey species found in the open forest on the lower slopes of the Porongurup Range.

See also
List of Acacia species

References

leioderma
Fabales of Australia
Acacias of Western Australia
Plants described in 1975
Taxa named by Bruce Maslin